Lisa Davis (born 20 April 1936) is an English-American former actress, who appeared in her first role at the age of 13 in the film The Man from Yesterday (1949). Her elder sister was big band singer Beryl Davis.

Biography
Born in into a show business family, her father is Harry Davis, the leader of the Oscar Rabin Orchestra, and her older sister is feature singer Beryl Davis. Lisa appeared in a total of 26 film and television projects from 1949 to 1962, appearing in guest spots in such shows as The George Burns Show, The Jack Benny Program, Perry Mason, The Beverly Hillbillies, and 77 Sunset Strip, among others. She provided the voice of Anita Radcliffe in One Hundred and One Dalmatians (1961). She was briefly on contract with Metro-Goldwyn-Mayer.

Davis was one of several actresses considered for the role of Princess Aouda in Around the World in 80 Days (1956) after Shirley MacLaine rejected it twice. Although Davis was scheduled to test for the role, MacLaine was ultimately chosen.

Personal life
Waltz was married to actor Patrick Waltz from 28 June 1958 to January 1971. The couple had three children together, daughters Carrie (b. 14 June 1959) and Wendy (b. 28 March 1965), and son Tim (b. 16 August 1966). Soon after the couple's divorce, Patrick Waltz died of a heart attack on 13 August 1972.

After her divorce from Waltz in 1971 was finalised, the former teen actress began dating black stage and screen actor Rudy Challenger. They were married on 31 December 1973. The interracial marriage was covered in Jet magazine during that week. She filed for divorce from Challenger in April 1976, then the couple divorced on 14 September 1978, after almost two and a half years of separation. 

She later married Brian R. White in a private ceremony in Los Angeles on 12 May 1979. She is retired from acting.

Partial filmography
The Woman in the Hall (1947) - Jay Blake as a child
The Man from Yesterday (1949) - Gloria Amersley
The Long Gray Line (1955) - Nell (uncredited)
The Virgin Queen (1955) - Jane (uncredited)
Spy Chasers (1955) - Princess Ann
Glory (1956) - Candy Trent
Fury at Gunsight Pass (1956) - Kathy Phillips
The Best Things in Life Are Free (1956) - Limp Party Girl (uncredited)
Baby Face Nelson (1957) - Ann Saper - the Lady in Red
The Dalton Girls (1957) - Rose Dalton
Queen of Outer Space (1958) - Motiya
Don't Give Up the Ship (1959) - Hilda (uncredited)
One Hundred and One Dalmatians (1961) - Anita Radcliffe (voice)
Star! (1968) - Fox Chorus Girl (uncredited)

References

External links
 
 

1936 births
Living people
Actresses from London
English child actresses
English film actresses
English stage actresses
English television actresses
English voice actresses